These are the results of the women's K-4 500 metres competition in canoeing at the 2004 Summer Olympics. The K-4 event is raced by four-person canoe sprint kayaks.

Medalists

Heats
The 10 teams first raced in two heats.  The top three finishers in each heat advanced directly to the final, and the remaining four teams advanced to the semifinal.  No teams were eliminated in the heats.  The heats were raced on August 23.

Semifinal
The top three finishers in the semifinal race qualified for the final, joining the six teams that had advanced directly from the heats.  The last place team was eliminated.   The semifinal was raced on August 25.

Final
The final was raced on August 27.

References
2004 Summer Olympics Canoe sprint results 
Sports-reference.com women's 2004 K-4 500 m results.
Yahoo! Sports Athens 2004 Summer Olympics Canoe/Kayak Results

Women's K-4 500
Olymp
Women's events at the 2004 Summer Olympics